Pogoń Prudnik, also known as shortly Pogoń, is a Polish basketball team based in Prudnik. The club currently plays in the Polish national 1st basketball league since the 2014–15 season.

Pogoń hosts its games at the Obuwnik Sports Hall.

Current roster

Season by season

References

Basketball teams in Poland
1954 establishments in Poland
Sport in Prudnik